Pedro Causil (born on April 14, 1991 in Cartagena, Colombia) is an inline speed skater and (ice) speed skater.

Career

Inline skating
Causil is a multiple time world champion in inline speed skating. Causil also won multiple Pan American Games medals as an inline skater. At the 2011 Pan American Games in Guadalajara, Mexico, Causil won two gold medals. Four years later at the 2015 Pan American Games in Toronto, Canada, Causil won a gold and one silver. Causil also won several medals at The World Games. Both at The World Games 2009 in Kaohsiung, Chinese Taipei, and at The World Games 2013 in Cali, Colombia, Causil won two gold and one bronze medal.

Speed skating
Causil switched to compete in speed skating as inline skating was not on the Olympic program. Causil became the first speed skater from South America to qualify for the Winter Olympics. He skated in the 500 and 1000 metres events at the 2018 Winter Olympics in Pyeongchang, South Korea.

See also
Colombia at the 2018 Winter Olympics
Speed skating at the 2018 Winter Olympics

References

1991 births
Living people
Colombian male speed skaters
Inline speed skaters
Olympic speed skaters of Colombia
Speed skaters at the 2018 Winter Olympics
Pan American Games medalists in roller skating
Pan American Games gold medalists for Colombia
Pan American Games silver medalists for Colombia
Roller speed skaters at the 2011 Pan American Games
Roller speed skaters at the 2015 Pan American Games
Sportspeople from Cartagena, Colombia
World Games gold medalists
World Games bronze medalists
Competitors at the 2009 World Games
Competitors at the 2013 World Games
Roller speed skaters at the 2019 Pan American Games
Medalists at the 2011 Pan American Games
Medalists at the 2015 Pan American Games
Medalists at the 2019 Pan American Games
21st-century Colombian people